Alatini Saulala (born 22 September 1967), was born in Tonga and educated at Brigham Young University–Idaho. He is 1.82m tall and weighs 97 kg, as described by Sports Illustrated:  [this] "California player is an explosive runner". Saulala currently coaches the San Mateo rugby union team. He now coaches for a local rugby team in Morgan Hill, California.

In October 2021 he was inducted into the US Rugby Foundation's hall of fame.

Saulala is a member of the Church of Jesus Christ of Latter-day Saints. He has two sons, and four daughters. He now earns a living as a licensed contractor in the San Jose area.

References

External links
 Google Video of highlights
 Rugby Articles

1967 births
Tongan Latter Day Saints
Tongan rugby union players
Tongan rugby union coaches
American rugby union players
American rugby union coaches
American civil engineering contractors
Brigham Young University–Idaho alumni
People from Vavaʻu
Living people
United States international rugby union players
Tongan emigrants to the United States